Katherine or Catherine Casey may refer to:

Kathryn Casey, American writer
Catherine Casey, the pseudonym of Fanny Jackson Coppin